William Piers may refer to:
 William Piers (bishop), vice-chancellor of Oxford University, bishop of Peterborough, and of Bath and Wells
 William Piers (constable), English constable in Ireland
 William Piers (priest), English Anglican priest
 William Piers (MP), British Whig politician